The 2011–12 UNC Asheville Bulldogs men's basketball team represented the University of North Carolina at Asheville during the 2011–12 NCAA Division I men's basketball season. The Bulldogs, led by 16th year head coach Ed Biedenbach, played their home games at the brand new Kimmel Arena and are members of the Big South Conference. They finished the season 24–10, 16–2 in Big South play to be crowned regular season champions. The Bulldogs won the Big South tournament for the second straight year to earn the conference's automatic berth into the NCAA tournament where they lost in the second round to Syracuse.

Roster

Schedule

|-
!colspan=9| Exhibition

|-
!colspan=9| Regular season

|-
!colspan=9| 2012 Big South Conference men's basketball tournament

|-
!colspan=9| 2012 NCAA tournament

References

UNC Asheville Bulldogs men's basketball seasons
UNC Asheville
UNC Asheville
UNC Asheville Bulldogs men's basketball team
UNC Asheville Bulldogs men's basketball team